The 2024 United States Senate election in North Dakota will be held on November 5, 2024, to elect a member of the United States Senate to represent the state of North Dakota. Incumbent Republican Senator Kevin Cramer is eligible to run for re-election to a second term in office.

Republican primary

Candidates

Potential
 Kevin Cramer, incumbent U.S. Senator (2019–present)

Democratic primary

Candidates

Filed paperwork
Kristin Hedger, manufacturing executive and nominee for North Dakota Secretary of State in 2006

General election

Predictions

References

2024
North Dakota
United States Senate